Gloydius is a genus of venomous pitvipers endemic to Asia, also known as Asian moccasins or Asian ground pit vipers. Named after American herpetologist Howard K. Gloyd, this genus is very similar to the North American genus Agkistrodon. 24 species are currently recognized.

Geographic range
Species of Gloydius are found in Russia, east of the Ural Mountains through Siberia, Iran, Himalayas from Pakistan, India, Nepal, China, Korea, Japan and the Ryukyu Islands.

Species

*) Not including the nominate subspecies.
T) Type species.

Taxonomy
Due to the strong morphological similarity, these snakes were classified in the genus Agkistrodon until very recently. However, by 1999 cladistic studies clearly showed that  Agkistrodon did not form a clade (indeed, it was not even paraphyletic) and was thus split into several genera.

A new species, G. tsushimaensis, was described by Isogawa, Moriya & Mitsui (1994). It is referred to as the Tsushima island pitviper and is found only on Tsushima Island, Japan.

References

Further reading

Hoge AR, Romano-Hoge SA (1981). "Poisonous Snakes of the World. I. Checklist of the Pitvipers: Viperoidea, Viperidae, Crotalinae". Memórias do Instituto Butantan 42/43: 179-309. (Gloydius, new genus).
Isogawa, Kiyoshi; Moriya, Akira; Mitsui, Sadaaki (1994). "A new snake from the genus Agkistrodon (Serpentes: Viperidae) from Tsushima Island, Nagasaki Prefecture". Japanese J. Herpetol. 15: 101-111. (Agkistrodon tsushimaensis, new species).

External links

Taxonomy comparison by Dr. Wolfgang Wüster at Dr. Brian Grieg Fry's Int'l Venom & Toxin Database. Accessed 25 July 2007.

 
Snakes of Asia
Snake genera